Q13 may refer to:

 Q13 (New York City bus)
 Ar-Ra'd, the thirteenth surah of the Quran
 , a Sirène-class submarine
 , a Q-ship of the Royal Navy
 KCPQ (Fox 13), formerly branded Q13